Rusty Romeos is a 1957 short subject directed by Jules White starring American slapstick comedy team The Three Stooges (Moe Howard, Larry Fine and Joe Besser). It is the 181st entry in the series released by Columbia Pictures starring the comedians, who released 190 shorts for the studio between 1934 and 1959.

Plot
The Stooges wake up one bright morning and happily realize that they are about to get married. After breakfast, they start cleaning the house. The usual antics occur as the boys make a near shambles of their home.

The trio try to reupholster a davenport, but end up clobbering Moe on several counts. First, Larry attempts to cut the upholstering with a scissor and ends up trimming Moe's sport coat. Then, to speed things up, they pour the upholstering tacks into a machine gun and aim at the davenport. The rapid fire release works well at first, but when Moe bends over the davenport to straighten the material, Larry and Joe argue over who gets to fire the next round while each holding onto the rifle It inadvertently fires sending about a dozen of the sharp wayward tacks into Moe's backside which causes him to exclaim, "I'm losing my mind!". After Larry and Joe quickly remove the tacks, Moe manages to swallow one.

The Stooges then head their separate ways to marry their sweetheart — unaware they are all engaged to the same girl Mabel (Connie Cezon). In rapid succession, Larry, Moe, and then Joe appear at their fiancee's home with engagement rings of varying sizes. When the boys discover their error, a nutty fight ensues. Moe and Larry eventually knock each other cold. However, Joe who had left earlier during the fracas, returns just as the frightened gold digger is about to make a quick exit and tricks her into bending over for some purposely dropped money then quickly moves behind her and fires the tack-filled rifle into Mabel's posterior with stinging accuracy, then begins spanking her with the butt end of the rifle while calling her a "jezebel" as the two timer wails in agony.

Production notes
Rusty Romeos is a remake of 1952's Corny Casanovas, using ample stock footage from the original. New footage was shot in two days on February 12–13, 1957.

Director Jules White was known for including many violent jokes revolving around the buttocks. Many other Columbia directors felt this type of humor was crass, and often shied away from it. However, White felt this was the trademark of the Stooges' mayhem. Nothing was too crass or exaggerated to be taken seriously.

When Larry is hitting Moe's head with a fireplace shovel, Shemp Howard's portrait can be seen in the background instead of Joe's. This was because Jules White opted not to reshoot this scene, hoping that audiences would focus on the fighting Moe and Larry instead of the portrait.

Quotes
Larry: "The tacks won't come out!"
Joe: "They went in; they must be income tax."

References

External links 
 
 
Rusty Romeos at threestooges.net

1957 films
1957 comedy films
The Three Stooges films
American black-and-white films
The Three Stooges film remakes
Films directed by Jules White
Columbia Pictures short films
1950s English-language films
1950s American films